A list of films produced in Russia in 2022 (see 2022 in film).

Film releases

Cultural Russian films
 About Fate is a 2022 American romantic film directed by Maryus Vaysberg.
 Fairytale is a 2022 experimental animated fantasy film.

See also 
 2022 in film

References

2022
Films
Lists of 2022 films by country or language